Breathless is a 1982 Dutch drama film directed by Mady Saks. It was entered into the 13th Moscow International Film Festival.

Plot summary

Cast
 Coen Bennink as Verpleger
 Bobby Boermans as Bobo
 Theu Boermans as Dokter
 Ursul de Geer as Van Poppel
 Frouke Fokkema as Verpleegster
 Pieter Groenier as Leo
 Cora Hollema as Patiente
 Maarten Kouwenhoven as Therapeut
 Marie Louise Stheins as Pauline
 Monique van de Ven as Anneke
 Ina van der Molen as Agaath
 Linda van Dyck as Martha
 Olga Zuiderhoek as Moeder

References

External links
 
 
 

1982 films
1982 drama films
Dutch drama films
1980s Dutch-language films